Eitel may refer to

 Eitel Friedrich II, Count of Hohenzollern (c. 1452–1512)
 Eitel Friedrich of Zollern (1454–1490), German nobleman and Admiral of the Netherlands
 Eitel Friedrich III, Count of Hohenzollern (1494–1525)
 Eitel Friedrich IV, Count of Hohenzollern (1545–1605)
 Eitel Frederick von Hohenzollern-Sigmaringen (1582–1625), Roman Catholic cardinal and Prince-Bishop of Osnabrück
 Prince Eitel Friedrich of Prussia (1883–1942), the second son of Emperor Wilhelm II of Germany
 Bernhard Eitel (born 1959), German earth scientist and geographer
 Eitel Cantoni (1906–1997), Uruguayan racing driver
 Ernst Johann Eitel (1838–1908), German Protestant missionary to China and author of a Cantonese dictionary
 A romanisation scheme of the Cantonese language named after Ernst Johann Eitel
 George G. Eitel (1858–1928), American surgeon who designed and built Eitel Hospital in Minneapolis, Minnesota
 Eitel Hospital
 Grzegorz Eitel (born 1981), Polish judoka
 Wilhelm Eitel (1891–1979), German-American scientist
 Eitel Brothers, German-born hoteliers and restaurateurs based in Chicago, United States
 Eitel Building, Seattle, Washington, United States

German masculine given names